Evagjelia Veli (born 16 July 1991) is an Albanian weightlifter. She won the gold medal in her event at the 2022 European Weightlifting Championships held in Tirana, Albania.

She competed at the 2016 Summer Olympics in Rio de Janeiro, in the women's 53 kg. She finished in 8th place. She competed at the Senior European Weightlifting Championship 2016 in Forde in Women's 53 kg. She finished in 5th place. She competed at the Senior European Weightlifting Championship 2017 in Split in Women's 53 kg, and finished in 4th place.

References

External links
 
 
 

1991 births
Living people
Albanian female weightlifters
Olympic weightlifters of Albania
Weightlifters at the 2016 Summer Olympics
European Weightlifting Championships medalists
20th-century Albanian women
21st-century Albanian women